Coimbatore North (station code: CBF) or Vadakovai is a railway station located in city of Coimbatore, in the state of Tamil Nadu in India. The railway line to Mettupalayam and onwards to Ooty branches off from here. The number of passenger trains passing through the Coimbatore North railway station is 144.

See also 
 
 Transport in Coimbatore

References

External links 

Salem railway division
Railway stations in Coimbatore